"Thot Shit" (known as "Thot Ish" in the radio edit) is a song by American rapper Megan Thee Stallion. The first solo release following her debut studio album Good News (2020) and the lead single from her compilation album Something for Thee Hotties (2021), the song was produced by LilJuMadeDaBeat and OG Parker and was released on June 11, 2021, through 1501 Certified Entertainment and 300 Entertainment. An uptempo song with heavy bass, it began as a freestyle by Megan Thee Stallion, and was inspired by her desire to reclaim the term "thot" from men who used it in a sexist manner. The song is performed from the perspective of her "raw and aggressive" alter ego, Tina Snow.

"Thot Shit" was nominated for Best Rap Performance at the 64th Annual Grammy Awards. The Aube Perrie-directed music video for "Thot Shit" was released on the same day as the song. It was inspired by conservative backlash against her and Cardi B's 2020 song "WAP", and horror films such as A Nightmare on Elm Street (1984) and The Shining (1980). In it, Megan Thee Stallion and several other women follow around a hypocritical conservative politician and twerk wherever he goes to exact revenge on him for posting a sexist comment underneath Megan Thee Stallion's "Body" video on YouTube.

Background and composition
Over a month before the release of "Thot Shit", several sci-fi-themed posts on Megan Thee Stallion's social media showed her in a "regeneration tank" and announced that she would be "recharging". A week before "Thot Shit" was released, she posted a CGI animation of herself announcing her return as her alter ego, Tina Snow. Megan Thee Stallion later posted a link to pre-save the song, and revealed the release date, title, and cover of "Thot Shit", which shows a shirtless man collapsed on a checkered tile floor next to a plate of food, a magazine featuring an image of Megan Thee Stallion, and a box of "Tina O's" cereal, with three women in white patent leather platform heels standing over him.

According to Megan Thee Stallion, "Thot Shit" began as a freestyle. After Shawn "Source" Jarrett, the song's engineer, asked for beats from producer OG Parker, he and producer Lil Ju met up at Parker's house in Atlanta to produce "about seven beats" together before sending them to Jarrett. Megan Thee Stallion chose to use one of them for "Thot Shit". The song was released at midnight on June 11, 2021. It is her first solo single of 2021 and her first solo release following the release of her debut studio album, Good News. It was also included on her 2021 mixtape Something for Thee Hotties as its lead single.

After the song's release, black TikTok creators went on "strike" and refused to choreograph a dance to the song. The strike was organized in response to black creators previously having not been credited or compensated for creating trending dances on the app which white TikTok users profited off of, and was intended to show that black users were essential to the success of the app. Dances created by white TikTok users to the song were heavily mocked online.

"Thot Shit" is an uptempo song with a "booming" bassline performed by Megan Thee Stallion as her "raw and aggressive" alter ego, Tina Snow, who first appeared on her 2018 EP of the same name and was inspired American rapper Pimp C's alter ego Tony Snow. The song was inspired by Megan Thee Stallion's desire to reclaim pejoratives used by men against women, such as "thot" and "hoe". The song's lyrics are described as "confidently risque" "self-confident", "sexually liberating", and "hit[ting] hard while also being playful". The chorus gives "twerk instructions". In the song, she references her three wins at the 63rd Annual Grammy Awards for Best New Artist, Best Rap Performance, and Best Rap Song with the line "I'm the shit per the Recording Academy". She also references her scheduled graduation from Texas Southern University in 2021 and the 1940 film Pinocchio, and quotes the 1998 miniseries The Temptations with the line, "Ain't nobody come to see you, Otis".

Critical reception
This song received critical acclaim from critics. Rolling Stones Mankaprr Conteh called "Thot Shit" "a sonic and visual explosion of sexuality, pride, and ideas" filled with "sharp zingers", adding that her "tone and candor" on the song combined her "hard-hitting raps" with "the strong sense of purpose she's developed as a woman that has been attacked and vilified for her boldness and honesty". Jezebels Shannon Melero referred to the song as "an absolute banger that is all the good things about Vax/Hot Girl Summer". Pitchfork named the song "Best New Track", with Cat Zhang writing, "'Thot Shit' follows the classic Megan recipe: unapologetic sex positivity, brash and delicious boasts, sharp-tongued goofiness." The A.V. Clubs Gabrielle Sanchez described "Thot Shit" as "charged and fast-paced, carrying the intensity last year's Good News too often lacked" with an "infectious" energy. Revolts Jon Powell wrote that the song had "some of her most hard-hitting bars to date", while Clashs Robin Murray called the song "a swaggering piece of no-take-shit empowerment, one that finds Megan at her most open". Robyn Mowatt of Okayplayer described the song "biting, energetic, and ideal for the looming summer".

Rankings

Accolades

Music video

Background and inspiration
The music video for "Thot Shit", directed by Aube Perrie and executive produced by Boris Labourguigne, was released on the same day as the single. After seeing the music video for L'Impératrice's song "Peur des filles", also directed by Perrie and produced by Labourguigne, Megan Thee Stallion's team reached out to the pair to make the video for "Thot Shit". It was filmed over the course of two 18-hour day shoots in April and choreographed by JaQuel Knight.

Several different camera rigs were built to film twerking shots, and the filming was partially inspired by the cinéma vérité style of documentary filmmaking. Prosthetic makeup was also used for the video's final shot. Parts of the video were filmed at the 101 Coffee Shop, a defunct diner in Los Angeles. Skip Pipo stars in the video as an older conservative senator meant to represent James P. Bradley, a Republican congressional candidate for California who, after listening to American rapper Cardi B's song "WAP" featuring Megan Thee Stallion, posted on social media that the two artists "are what happens when children are raised without God and without a strong father figure" and claimed that he came across the song accidentally. A day before its release, Megan Thee Stallion teased the video by posting DJ Khaled's shocked reaction to it on her Instagram. The video's release was preceded by a livestream hosted on YouTube by Megan Thee Stallion.

Synopsis
The horror-themed video begins with the senator sitting in his office, eating Cheetos and leaving a YouTube comment underneath Megan Thee Stallion's music video for "Body", calling it "stupid" and "regressive" before unzipping his pants to masturbate to it. Megan Thee Stallion, who appears as her alter ego, Tina Snow, then anonymously calls the man to tell him not to "fuck with" the women who make up every part of his life in a monologue inspired by the 1999 film Fight Club. She and several other working-class women (the "Hotties") then hit the man with a garbage truck, and spend their time exacting revenge on him by following him around as he does mundane tasks and twerking wherever he goes, including at a diner, in his office, in his bathtub, at the supermarket, and at a construction site. The video also references the 1984 slasher film A Nightmare on Elm Street with a scene in which Megan Thee Stallion's hand comes out of the man's bathtub and gives him the middle finger, and references the 1980 psychological horror film The Shining with a room key with the number 237 on it. The video ends with Megan Thee Stallion and the other girls grafting a labia onto his face in place of his mouth.

Reception
Andrew Sacher of BrooklynVegan called the video "very badass, especially following the right wing reactions to 'WAP'". Conteh of Rolling Stone described the video as "stylish" and "outrageous", and wrote that it was the best music video to be released this year so far. Esquires Matt Miller wrote that the video "brilliantly skewers slut-shaming conservatives" and was "a hilarious visualization", also comparing conservative political commentators Ben Shapiro and Tucker Carlson, who commented negatively on "WAP", to the senator in the video. Gabrielle Sanchez of The A.V. Club wrote that Megan Thee Stallion addresses "the hypocrisy of sexist, derogatory comments made by men in power" about sexually empowered women "with confidence and plenty of laughs, letting the opinions of men roll off her back with ease". Erica Gonzales of Harper's Bazaar commented on the video's "absurd, dark humor" and described the visuals as "surreal". Revolts Jon Powell wrote that the video "successfully mixes Megan's sex appeal with her aggressiveness on the microphone" and "require[s] more than a few replays". For Popsugar, Navi Ahluwalia called the video "a powerful commentary on the world of online hate", while USA Todays Elise Brisco described it as "iconic" and "empowering". Time Outs Andy Kryza called it "pure MTS, an amped up celebration of sex and expression as only the woman behind 'WAP' can muster". Allison Hussey of Pitchfork wrote that the video had a "sexy surreality" and praised the "commanding athleticism" of the other women in the video. TechCrunchs Taylor Hatmaker called the video a "a playful but important paean to essential workers" and "a biting commentary on the wealthy white establishment that exploits their labor".

In June 2021, Complex named the video for "Thot Shit" the second-best music video released that year until then, with Eric Skelton calling it "wildly entertaining, powerful, and funny" and stating that the video's ending was "the most memorable scene of the year so far". Pitchforks Eric Torres listed the video as the best video released in June 2021, describing it as "the new crown jewel in Megan Thee Stallion’s run of astounding music videos".

Live performances
Megan Thee Stallion performed "Thot Shit" at the BET Awards in June 2021, at Rolling Loud Miami in July 2021, at Lollapalooza in August 2021, and at ACL (Austin City Limits) Music Festival in Austin, Texas in October 2021.

Credits and personnel
Credits adapted from Tidal.
 Lil Juproduction
 OG Parkerproduction
 Mike Deanmixing, mastering
 Shawn "Source" Jarrettrecording, engineering

Charts

Weekly charts

Year-end charts

Certifications

Release history

References

Masturbation in fiction
Megan Thee Stallion songs
2021 songs
2021 singles
300 Entertainment singles